Tartu Hanseatic Days is an annual festival held in Tartu, Estonia. The name of the festival refers to the fact that Tartu was a member of medieval Hanseatic League.

First festival took place in 1995. The festival is organized by Tartu City and Tartu City Museum. One of the main event of the festival is Hansalaat ('Hanseatic Market').

In 2007, the festival has about 70,000 visitors.

See also
 Hanseatic Days of New Time

References

External links

 

Festivals in Estonia
Culture in Tartu